Eisenhower High School, occasionally referred to as simply "Ike", is a high school located in the Metropolitan Detroit suburb of Shelby Township. It is consistently ranked as the top performing high school in Macomb County.

History
Opened in 1972, Eisenhower is one of two public high school located in Shelby Township. Until the 1990s, the school had a Washington Township mailing address. As the surrounding area began to develop, the city limits changed and the school fell into Shelby Township boundaries. The original design of the school had few windows and no walls in the individual wings, giving the school an open concept. This open concept failed, as multiple classes could be heard at the same time. The building was quickly segmented into its current classroom structure. Today, the surrounding area is suburban (a part of Metro Detroit), and has subdivisions and strip-malls within the school's immediate proximity. Over the years, Eisenhower has received several renovations. In 2002, the restrooms adjacent to the Commons were extensively renovated. In 2004, the current media center and library were constructed. The following year, in 2005, the Performing Arts Center (PAC) was constructed on the easternmost side of the school.

Competitions

Eisenhower's Quiz Bowl team has won four state championships (the 1989, 1992, and 2000 Michigan State Championship Quiz Bowl and the 2000 Michigan NAQT State Championship Tournament) and two national championships (the 1990 and 2000 American Scholastics Competition Network Tournament of Champions).

Eisenhower's Varsity Dance Team has earned top honors multiple times in regional competitions, as well as the UDA National Dance Team Championship under coach Rachelle Kiehle.  Since 2009, the team has been consistently ranked in the top three dance teams in the nation, placing first in the Jazz category in 2014.

In 2015 the team placed first in Hip Hop and second in Jazz, while Eisenhower's Junior Varsity Dance Team scored their first National championship with their Pom routine and took third place in Jazz.
 
On February 5, 2017, both teams captured first place gold as Eisenhower JV Dance won the Pom division and Eisenhower Varsity Dance topped both the Hip Hop and Jazz categories.

The Eisenhower Science Olympiad team placed 1st in the High School division at the Region 7 tournament in 2022, competing against schools in Macomb and St. Clair counties.  This continues the team’s 1st place streak which began in 2019.  Other years when the team has placed 1st in the region include 1992, 1995, 2002 and 2005.

The team has a long history of strong performance in Michigan, all the way back to the beginning of the Science Olympiad program in 1983.  Eisenhower placed 2nd in the state that first year.  The most competitive Eisenhower team was probably during the years of 1987-1990 when the team placed 1st twice and 2nd twice, in the state.  Typically, the top 2 Michigan teams qualify to compete at the National tournament.

Academics

As of the 2014–2015 school year, Eisenhower ranked better than 89.9% of all high schools in Michigan. As such, Eisenhower is the top performing high school in Macomb County, and one of the top performing high schools in the Metro Detroit area.

Eisenhower students have a variety of AP courses to choose from. Eisenhower's AP participation rate is 55%.

Student body

Breakdown of Student Body (2013-2014 School Year)
White: 1,951 (95%)
African American: 45 (2%)
Asian: 38 (2%)
Hispanic: 16 (1%)

Publications
Eisenhower's publications department is advised by former Oakland Press journalist, Erica L. Kincannon, and has received numerous awards at both the state and national levels. The department produces an annual school yearbook, Esprit de Corps, and a monthly newspaper, The Eagle's Eye. The newspaper also features an online website, IkeNews.com. Students may elect to join the Newspaper and/or Yearbook staffs, and take them as a class during the day.

In 2012, Esprit de Corps was named a Pacemaker Finalist by the National Scholastic Press Association, one of the most prestigious awards of journalistic excellence.

In 2014, The Eagle's Eye editor-in-chief, Lauren Kostiuk, was named Michigan High School Journalist of the Year.

Key Club
Eisenhower's Key Club was formed in 1973. During the 2008–2009 school year, Key Club, for the first time in its history, was awarded the honored title of "Diamond-Level Distinguished" (the highest honor a Key Club may receive).  IKE was one of the two Michigan Key Clubs to receive the title that year.

Notable alumni
Brad Smith, racing driver
Justin Meram, Iraqi-American professional footballer currently of the MLS side, Real Salt Lake.
Jax Taylor, American actor, star of reality tv show Vanderpump Rules
Peter Litvin, American actor, music producer, film maker, audio engineer, composer, songwriter, performer, YouTuber, multi-instrumentalist
Chloe Moriondo, American singer-songwriter
Dan Keczmer Former professional ice hockey player who played in the National Hockey League (NHL)
John DiGiorgio Former professional NFL player

References

External links
 School Website

Public high schools in Michigan
Educational institutions established in 1972
Schools in Macomb County, Michigan
1972 establishments in Michigan